Yuanyang Hudie may refer to:

Mandarin Ducks and Butterflies, a school of Chinese literature in the early 20th century
A West Lake Moment, a 2005 Chinese film